is a Japanese actress. During her 70 years spanning career, she has worked with directors like Akira Kurosawa, Kenji Mizoguchi, Yasujirō Ozu and Mikio Naruse, appearing in films such as Tokyo Story, Sansho the Bailiff, The Bad Sleep Well, Mothra and High and Low.

Biography
Kagawa was born in Asō (currently Namegata), Ibaraki Prefecture, and graduated from Tokyo Metropolitan Tenth High School for Girls in 1949. She was discovered in the "New Face Nomination" contest run by the Tokyo Shimbun in 1949 and gave her film debut the following year in Mado kara tobidase. She regularly appeared in films by Akira Kusosawa, Kenji Mizoguchi, Yasujirō Ozu, Mikio Naruse, Shirō Toyoda, Hiroshi Shimizu and others.

Kagawa married in 1963 and followed her husband, a newspaper reporter, to New York City. After her return from the US, she acted in television dramas until she appeared again on the big screen in Satsuo Yamamoto's Karei-naru ichizoku (1974).

In 2011, the National Museum of Modern Art, Tokyo, honored her long career and contribution to Japanese cinema with an exhibition dedicated to her.

Selected filmography

Films

 Tokyo Heroine (1950)
 Man in the Storm (1950)
 Mother (1952)
 Lightning (1952)
 Tokyo Story (1953)
 Love Letter (1953)
 Sansho the Bailiff (1954)
 The Crucified Lovers (1954)
 Onna no Koyomi (1954)
 The Shiinomi School
 Christ in Bronze (1956)
 A Cat, Shozo, and Two Women (1956)
 Shūu (1956)
 An Osaka Story (1957) 
 The Lower Depths (1957)
 A Holiday in Tokyo (1958)
 Anzukko (1958)
 The Three Treasures (1959)
 The Bad Sleep Well (1960)
 Mothra (1961)
 The Story of Osaka Castle (1961)
 High and Low (1963)
 Red Beard (1965)
 Karei-naru Ichizoku (1974)
 Kenji Mizoguchi: The Life of a Film Director (1975)
 Tora-san's Dream of Spring (1979)
 Madadayo (1993)
 After Life (1998)
 Letters from the Mountains (2002)
 Mifune: The Last Samurai (2016)
 Tenshi no Iru Toshokan (2017)
 Shimamori no Tō (2022)
 The Pass: Last Days of the Samurai (2022)

Television
 Hana no Shōgai (1963)
 Kasuga no Tsubone (1989)
 In This Corner of the World (2018)

Honours
 Medal with Purple Ribbon (1998)
 Kinuyo Tanaka Award (1993)
 Order of the Rising Sun (2004)
 FIAF Award (2011)

References

External links
 

1931 births
Living people
Japanese film actresses
20th-century Japanese actresses
21st-century Japanese actresses
Recipients of the Medal with Purple Ribbon
Recipients of the Order of the Rising Sun, 4th class